2017 Netball Quad Series may refer to:
 2017 Netball Quad Series (January/February), netball tournament played in the first half of the year
 2017 Netball Quad Series (August/September), netball tournament played in the second half of the year